Trechus amblygonellus is a species of ground beetle in the subfamily Trechinae. It was described by Jeannel in 1964.

References

amblygonellus
Beetles described in 1964